During the 1986–1987 season Associazione Calcio Fiorentina competed in Serie A, Coppa Italia and UEFA Cup.

Summary 
During July Pier Cesare Baretti arrived to the club as its new Chairman and appointed a new manager for the squad Eugenio Bersellini, former winner of 1979-80 Serie A title managing Inter. The team was reinforced with several players such as Roberto Galbiati, Marco Landucci replacing goalkeeper Giovanni Galli, transferred out to A.C. Milan. From Parma F.C. arrived midfielder Nicola Berti and from U.S. Avellino 1912 Argentine forward Ramon Diaz. After a year injured, Roberto Baggio, could play as starter.

The team was early eliminated in both Coppa Italia and UEFA Cup. The squad finishes in a disappointing 9th place in Serie A Argentine striker Ramon Diaz was the club's top scorer with 10 goals. With 19 matches and 4 goals, Giancarlo Antognoni played his last season for the club, (341 games played and 61 goals since 1972) transferring out to Lausanne Sports.

Squad

Transfers

Competitions

Serie A

League table

Result by round

Matches

Coppa Italia

First round

UEFA Cup

Round of 32

Statistics

Players statistics

References

Bibliografia

External links 
 
 

ACF Fiorentina seasons
Fiorentina